Gamkonora is a North Halmahera language of Indonesia.

References

Languages of Indonesia

North Halmahera languages